William Amerman (born September 1, 1953) is an American politician. He was a member of the North Dakota House of Representatives from the 26th District, serving from 2002 until 2016. He is a member of the Democratic-NPL party.

References

1953 births
Living people
21st-century American politicians
Democratic Party members of the North Dakota House of Representatives